Hà Thị Nguyên (born 4 July 1990) is a Vietnamese taekwondo practitioner.

References

Asian Games medalists in taekwondo
Taekwondo practitioners at the 2010 Asian Games
Taekwondo practitioners at the 2014 Asian Games
1990 births
Vietnamese female taekwondo practitioners
Living people
Asian Games bronze medalists for Vietnam
Medalists at the 2014 Asian Games
Southeast Asian Games gold medalists for Vietnam
Southeast Asian Games silver medalists for Vietnam
Southeast Asian Games medalists in taekwondo
Competitors at the 2009 Southeast Asian Games
Competitors at the 2011 Southeast Asian Games
Competitors at the 2015 Southeast Asian Games
Asian Taekwondo Championships medalists
21st-century Vietnamese women
20th-century Vietnamese women